Hugo da Silva Oliveira (born 10 February 2002) is a Portuguese footballer who plays for the Under-23 squad of Vizela as a defender.

Football career
He made his professional debut for Oliveirense on 22 January 2021 in the Liga Portugal 2.

References

External links

2002 births
Sportspeople from Santa Maria da Feira
Living people
Portuguese footballers
Association football defenders
U.D. Oliveirense players
F.C. Vizela players
Liga Portugal 2 players
Primeira Liga players